Salix cascadensis, the Cascade willow, is a species of flowering plant in the family Salicaceae, sparsely distributed in British Columbia in Canada and the states of Washington, Wyoming, Colorado, and Utah in the United States. It is a petite shrub with stems that emerge from underground branches.

References

cascadensis
Flora of British Columbia
Flora of Washington (state)
Flora of Wyoming
Flora of Colorado
Flora of Utah
Plants described in 1907